Stelis stergiosii is a species of orchid plant native to Venezuela.

References 

stergiosii
Flora of Venezuela